Travel nursing is a nursing assignment concept that developed in response to the nursing shortage in the 1970s. This industry supplies nurses who travel to work in temporary nursing positions, mostly in hospitals. While travel nursing traditionally refers specifically to the nursing profession, it can also be used as a blanket term to refer nursing and allied health professionals, physicians, advanced practice nurses, physician assistants, dentists and other support staff including certified nursing assistants.

Healthcare Professional Travel Contracts exist throughout the world wherever there is a need and shortage of appropriate healthcare professionals in hospitals and facilities, disaster relief and global aid projects.

Although in US history there had been nurses doing temporary assignments and the military nurse corps, the first travel nurses were recruited by a private agency in 1978 by entrepreneur, Bruce Male, with his agency Travel Nursing Corps later called "Travcorps." In December 1999, Charterhouse / Cross Country Staffing acquired TravCorps Corporation (TravCorps), which was owned by investment funds managed by Morgan Stanley Private Equity (Morgan Stanley) and certain members of TravCorps’ management, and subsequently changed the name to Cross Country TravCorps, Inc. In 2001 the name was changed to Cross Country, Inc., and in October 2001, Cross Country completed their initial public offering. Subsequently, in May 2003, the name was changed to Cross Country Healthcare, Inc.

Reasons cited for pursuing travel nursing opportunities include higher pay in some cases, professional growth and development, and personal adventure. Travelers typically select from one or more recruitment agencies to act as intermediaries between the traveler and hospitals or other potential employers, but may also work as an Independent Contractor (IC). Agencies may submit applications for numerous positions concurrently on behalf of a traveler.

US Clinical requirements
In the U.S., the usual requirements for becoming a travel nurse within the private staffing industry are to have graduated from an accredited nursing program, and a minimum of 1.5 years of clinical experience with 1 year being preferred in one's specialty and licensure in the state of employment, often granted through reciprocity with the home state's board of nursing. Although most places do require at least 1 year of nursing experience, it can still be easy to get into travel nursing from the start.

Some travel agencies will reimburse travelers for the cost of the license or other required certifications. A travel nurse may receive a minimal orientation to the new hospital (and rarely no orientation at all). Travel nurses are expected to be very experienced and knowledgeable in the given specialty.

If the nurse's home state has joined the Nurse Licensure Compact (NLC), the nurse can work in any other compact state as long as the home state license is in good standing, and the permanent residence is in a compact state. This facilitates the license reciprocity process and potentially speeds up the time to employment. There are currently 26 states participating in the NLC, including states such as Florida, Texas, or Arizona. 

Travel nurses are required to have a nursing license with the appropriate state, but they may also need to complete other requirements, such as Basic Life Support, Advanced Cardiac Life Support, and Pediatric Advanced Life Support courses. to sign on with a travel nursing agency.

Travel nursing assignments
Travelers typically work under a short-term contract.  In the United States, these contracts typically range from 4 to 13 weeks, although 26-week assignments are also possible. If there is a continual need for travelers they will be offered extension contracts. Contracts outside of the U.S. can last 1–2 years. Frequently, a permanent position is offered by the hospital at the end of the contract. Travel nurses can also work abroad. Common jobs for travel nurses include:

 Hospitals 
 Clinics 
 Community health center
 Private practices 
 Rehabilitation facilities 
 Nursing home

Compensation

Pay
Travel nurses are paid by the travel nursing agency that placed them, which in turn is paid by the hospital.  The amount of money a hospital pays to the agency is referred to as the bill rate. The agency calculates and subtracts costs, overhead and profit margin from the bill rate and pays the difference to the traveler.  To compensate travelers, higher rates than the rates paid to permanent staff is the norm. Pay can range from $30–50/hour or more depending on various factors. As of November 2022, the average pay per hour for travel nurses is $47.98.  Travel nurses may work between 36 to 48 hours (about 2 days) per week with over time included. Additionally, travel nurses may receive bonuses. Hospital bonuses range from U.S. $250 to U.S. $5000. Variables that affect pay include the location of the assignment (vacation destinations tend to be more competitive and therefore able to find willing applicants for less), demand for the position, local cost of living and the type of nursing specialty being sought. 

Travel nurses assigned to rapid response and “crisis” situations, more specifically nurses needed to help in contexts involving natural disasters, are typically compensated more for their work.

Since all costs and compensation must come out of the bill rate, a traveler working for an agency offering a high level of benefits will probably be paid lower wages than one working for an agency that offers few or no non-wage benefits.

Housing
If travel agencies provide housing, it usually consists of a one-bedroom furnished apartment. Utilities (electric, water, trash) may be included. Telephone, cable television and sometimes Internet service can be included. Housing may include a washer and dryer, dishwasher, microwave and basic housewares such as pots, dishes, utensils and linens. Some travel companies allow the travel nurse to participate in the housing search and selection process.

Nearly all agencies will offer a housing stipend if the nurse chooses to secure housing independent of the agency. Stipend amounts can be substantial (even higher than actual wages) and these may be provided tax-free if the traveler has a qualifying tax home as determined by the IRS  Publication 463 or with the assistance of qualified tax preparers experienced in working with travelers. Some companies require the traveler to take the housing stipend. The housing stipend or the value of the provided housing is taxed as part of the pay if the traveler does not have a qualifying tax home.

Assignment reimbursements
A travel allowance is generally paid by the travel agency. Some agencies offer healthcare insurance (or reimbursement for insurance held elsewhere), the ability to contribute to 401(k)accounts (sometimes with matching funds), licensure reimbursement, referral bonuses and loyalty reward programs. Some companies are even starting to add vacation and sick days, stock investment options and continuing education reimbursements.

Importance during the Covid-19 Pandemic

Travel nurses played an essential role during the COVID-19 pandemic by servicing the demand for frontline clinicians as hotspots popped up across the United States. Data from Wanderly, an independent travel nurse marketplace, showed the significant demand for travel ICU nurses in COVID-19 hotspots.

Organizations
There are 500+ U.S. travel nurse companies that employ nursing and allied healthcare professionals.

Of the key healthcare staffing firms in the United States, only two are publicly traded: Cross Country Healthcare, Inc. (NASDAQ: CCRN) and AMN Healthcare, Inc. (NYSE: AMN).

References

Nursing specialties
Medical outsourcing